This is a list of the NCAA indoor champions in a now defunct middle distance event.  Generally that was the 1000 yard run until 1983, and the 1000 meters being contested 1984–87.  In 1986–87, the track in Oklahoma City was short.  Hand timing was used until 1975, starting in 1976 fully automatic timing was used.

Champions
Key
y=yards
w=wind aided
A=Altitude assisted

1000 Yards

1000 Meters

References

NCAA Indoor Track and Field Championships
Indoor track and field in the United States